The 1989 Western Athletic Conference men's basketball tournament was held March 8–11 at the Jon M. Huntsman Center at the University of Utah in Salt Lake City, Utah.

UTEP defeated top-seeded Colorado State in the championship game, 73–60, to clinch their third WAC men's tournament championship

The Miners, in turn, received an automatic bid to the 1989 NCAA tournament. They were joined in the tournament by regular season champions Colorado State, who earned an at-large bid.

Format
The tournament field remained fixed at nine teams, and teams were again seeded based on regular season conference records. All teams were entered into the quarterfinal round with the exception of the two lowest-seeded teams, who played in the preliminary first round to determine who would then play against the tournament's top seed.

Bracket

References

WAC men's basketball tournament
Tournament
WAC men's basketball tournament
WAC men's basketball tournament